George Hall (November 19, 1916 – October 21, 2002) was a Canadian theatre, television, and film actor, best remembered by his role as the 93-year-old Indiana Jones in the TV series The Young Indiana Jones Chronicles (1992). He debuted on Broadway in 1946. He also played Ernie Tuttle #2 and John the butler on the television soap opera The Edge of Night and as Mr. Eldridge in the AMC series Remember WENN, which aired in the mid-1990s.

Death 
Hall died on October 21, 2002 of complications from a stroke. He was 85 years old.

Filmography

References

External links
 
 
 

1916 births
2002 deaths
Canadian male film actors
Canadian male stage actors
Canadian male television actors
Male actors from Toronto
People from Hawthorne, New York
Canadian expatriates in the United States